Leila Forouhar (Leilâ Foruhar; born 23 February 1959) is an Iranian pop and classical singer. She was a child star, acting from the age of 3. She relocated to next door Turkey in 1986, then to Paris, before emigrating to Los Angeles in 1988.

Career
Leila is the daughter of the late Iranian actor Jahangir Forouhar. As a child she acted in movies in minor roles, receiving recognition for her part in Soltane Ghalbha (King of Hearts). As a teenager she began modeling for fashion magazines. She continued to act in movies and has featured in over 47 films, including Ezteraab, Four Sisters and The Thirsty Ones.

Move to France
War with neighboring Iraq had a negative impact on the Iranian movie and music industry. The Forouhar family stayed in Tehran until deciding to emigrate from the country.

Move to the United States
In 1988 Forouhar and her family moved to the United States.

Leila's songs are popular in countries including Iran, Afghanistan, Tajikistan, Uzbekistan, Iraq, Armenia and  the United States. She has released more than 20 albums. Her album "Planet of Harmony" included songs in English, Italian, Greek, Arabic, Hebrew, Dari Persian, Armenian, Turkish and Kurdish.

In August 2004 Leila married Los Angeles-based Afghan-American businessman Esmaeil Nabi. Forouhar's nephew is American Muslim reformer Reza Aslan.

In March 2010 she sang at an international celebration of the festival of Nowruz at the Library of Congress in Washington, D.C.

Leila covered Dolly Parton's Jolene on her 1976 album Do Parande (English: Two Birds).

Discography
Unknown Release
 1974: Hadis

Avang Records Releases
 1977: Leila Forouhar 2 (Ham Parvaz)

Caltex Records Releases
 1990: Makhmal-e-Naz
 1991: Hedieh (with Shahram Solati)
 1991: Shance
 1994: Attal Mattal (with Ebi)
 1995: Tapesh
 1996: Saraab
 1997: Love Songs
 1997: Planet of Harmony
 1997: Dance Beat
 1998: Love Story
 1999: Didar (with Shahram Shabpareh)
 1999: Yek Samado Do Leila (soundtrack from the play "Yek Samado Do Leila")
 2000: Tasvir
 2001: Story of Yours, Story of Mine
 2003: Live in Concert at the Kodak Theatre
 2005: A Kiss
 2008: Jooni Joonom (Song)
 2008: My Moon
 2012: From My Heart

Taraneh Record Releases
 1993: Hamsafar
 1994: Do Parandeh
 2012: From My Heart

Pars Video Releases
 1990: Makhmal-e-Naaz
 1994: Parandeha (with Mahasti and Shahram Solati)
 1999: Ghahremanane Vatan (with Andy and Dariush)

MZM Records Releases
 1992: Bahaaneh
 2008: Maahe Man

Other Records Releases
 2000: Lets party (with Maxim & The Boyz)

Single Tracks
 1992: Nobahar (with other singers)
 1994: Telesm (With Shamaei zadeh)
 1996: Zamin larzid (with other singers)
 2003: Sayad Nova
 2006: Music (with 23 singers)
 2007: IRAN(with Omid Soltani)
 2007: The Memories (dedicated to Mahasti)
 2009: Bedoon IRAN Nemimireh
 2011: Do Parandeh (Remix)
 2013: Kaashki
 2013: Eshgham 
 2014: Ba Tou 
 2014: Khayli Hasasam
 2014: Fereshtehaye Kucholo 
 2015: Kheili Douset Daram 
 2016: In Rooza 
 2016: Hesse Taraneh 
 2017: Begoo Baa Mani

Videography
 Rouzegar (VHS)
 The Return (VHS)
 Flashback (VHS)
 A Kiss (DVD)
 Live in Concert at the Kodak Theatre (DVD)
 4 DVD Collection #1

Filmography
 Khak
 King of Hearts (1968)
 Aramesh dar Hozooreh Digaraan
 Baagheh Boloor
 Shabeh Aftabi
 Ezteraab
 Four Sisters
 The Thirsty Ones
 Morad & laleh
 Iman
 The Beauty Sin
 Golden Cage
 The Springtime Connection
  Gorbe Koor

References

Further reading

External links
Leila Forouhar's Official Facebook page

1959 births
Living people
Iranian musicians
People from Isfahan
Actors from Isfahan
Iranian women singers
Iranian film actresses
Musicians from Isfahan
Caltex Records artists
Taraneh Records artists
Iranian child actresses
Persian-language singers
Kurdish-language singers
Iranian classical singers
Iranian women pop singers
20th-century Iranian actresses
20th-century Iranian women singers
Iranian emigrants to the United States
Exiles of the Iranian Revolution in the United States